Valbuena de Duero is a municipality located in the province of Valladolid, Castile and León, Spain. According to the 2004 census (INE), the municipality has a population of 502 inhabitants.

Villages
San Bernardo is a village within Valbuena de Duero municipality. It was founded in the 1950s by the Instituto Nacional de Colonización. Its inhabitants came from Santa María de Poyos, a town in Guadalajara Province that was submerged by the waters of the Embalse de Buendía reservoir.
Presently there is a Ribera del Duero DO wine cellar in San Bernardo named after the village.

The Valbuena Abbey is located within the limits of Valbuena de Duero municipality.

References

Municipalities in the Province of Valladolid